Wichterle could mean:

Otto Wichterle, Czech chemist and inventor, best known for his invention of soft contact lenses.
The Wichterle reaction, a chemical reaction invented by Otto Wichterle.
3899 Wichterle, an asteroid named after Otto Wichterle.